"She Don't Put It Down" is a song by American hip hop recording artist Joe Budden. It was released on October 16, 2012, as the first single from his sixth studio album No Love Lost (2013). The song, produced by T-Minus, features guest appearances from Lil Wayne and R&B singer Tank. It marked Joe Budden's first song as a lead artist in the Billboard Hot 100 since his 2003 hit "Pump It Up”, though it only peaked at #96.

Music video
On February 5, 2013, the music video for the song along with the remix featuring Fabolous, Lil Wayne and Tank premiered on 106 & Park. Twista does not appear in the video.

Remix
The official remix was released for digital download on January 18, 2013, featuring Fabolous, Twista and Tank.

Track listing
 Digital single

Charts

Release history

References

2012 singles
Joe Budden songs
Lil Wayne songs
Tank (American singer) songs
Songs written by Lil Wayne
Fabolous songs
Twista songs
Songs written by Twista
Songs written by Tank (American singer)
2012 songs
Songs written by T-Minus (record producer)
MNRK Music Group singles